Executive Order 12333, signed on December 4, 1981 by U.S. President Ronald Reagan, was an Executive Order intended to extend powers and responsibilities of U.S. intelligence agencies and direct the leaders of U.S. federal agencies to co-operate fully with CIA requests for information. This executive order was titled United States Intelligence Activities.

It was amended by Executive Order 13355: Strengthened Management of the Intelligence Community, on August 27, 2004.  On July 30, 2008, President George W. Bush issued Executive Order 13470 amending Executive Order 12333 to strengthen the role of the Director of National Intelligence (DNI).

Part 1 
"Goals, Direction, Duties and Responsibilities with Respect to the National Intelligence Effort" lays out roles for various intelligence agencies, including the Departments of Defense, Energy, State, and Treasury.

Part 2 
"Conduct of Intelligence Activities" provides guidelines for actions of intelligence agencies.

Collection of Information 
Part 2.3  permits collection, retention and dissemination of the following types of information along with several others.

Proscription on assassination 
Part 2.11 of this executive order reiterates a proscription on US intelligence agencies sponsoring or carrying out an assassination. It reads:

No person employed by or acting on behalf of the United States Government shall engage in, or conspire to engage in, assassination.

Previously, EO 11905 (Gerald Ford) had banned political assassinations and EO 12036 (Jimmy Carter) had further banned indirect U.S. involvement in assassinations. As early as 1998, this proscription against assassination was reinterpreted, and relaxed, for targets who are classified by the United States as connected to terrorism.

Impact
Executive Order 12333 has been regarded by the American intelligence community as a fundamental document authorizing the expansion of data collection activities.<ref name=Ackerman>Spencer Ackerman, "NSA Reformers Dismayed after Privacy Board Vindicates Surveillance Dragnet: Privacy and Civil Liberties Oversight Board Endorses Agency's So-called '702' Powers, Plus Backdoor Searches of Americans' Information", 'The Guardian (London), July 2, 2014.</ref> The document has been employed by the National Security Agency as legal authorization for its collection of unencrypted information flowing through the data centers of internet communications giants Google and Yahoo!.

In July 2014 chairman David Medine and two other members of the Privacy and Civil Liberties Oversight Board, a government oversight agency, indicated a desire to review Executive Order 12333 in the near future, according to a report by journalist Spencer Ackerman of The Guardian.

In July 2014, former State Department official John Tye published an editorial in The Washington Post, citing his prior access to classified material on intelligence-gathering activities under Executive Order 12333, and arguing that the order represented a significant threat to Americans' privacy and civil liberties.

In April 2021, the Privacy and Civil Liberties Oversight Board published the results of its six-year review of EO 12333.

A letter from two senators has been partly declassified.

 See also 
United States Intelligence Community
Church Committee
COINTELPRO
List of United States federal executive orders
 Targeted killing

References

 Further reading 
Full text
 Ronald Reagan, "Executive Order 12333United States Intelligence Activities", Federal Register, December 4, 1981.

 External links 

 Metadata concerning Executive Order 12333, US Federal Register – indicates other executive orders that this E.O. amends, revokes, and is amended by.
 Executive Order 12333 Documents Redefine 'Collection,' Authorize Majority Of Dragnet Surveillance Programs, Techdirt, 2014/09/29
 Should U.S. officials say anything that could harm U.S. soldiers?, Milnet – (a 5k summary of eo12333)
 Executive Order 13355: Strengthened Management of the Intelligence Community, White House, August 27, 2004.
 Executive Order 13355: Strengthened Management of the Intelligence Community, US Federal Register, September 1, 2004.
 Procedures Governing the Activities of DoD Intelligence Components that Affect United States Persons, December 1982.
 Another Law Under Assault, The Washington Post'', September 29, 2005.

1981 establishments in the United States
1981 in law
12333
American intelligence gathering law